The Harrisburg Stampede were a professional indoor football team based in Harrisburg, Pennsylvania. The Stampede participated in several different leagues over their history: the American Indoor Football Association in 2009 and 2010, the Southern Indoor Football League in 2011, American Indoor Football in 2012 and 2013, and the Professional Indoor Football League in what became their final season of play in 2014. The team suspended operations on December 30, 2014.

The Stampede played their home games at the Pennsylvania Farm Show Complex & Expo Center for their first five seasons. In 2014, they played in the Giant Center in nearby Hershey.

The "Stampede" name alluded to the team's original home venue, which hosts the annual Pennsylvania Farm Show, and the team's colors were blue, black and white.

History

2009
The team was co-founded by John Morris and Fred Clark. In September 2008, the team announced that they would use the nickname "Stampede" after narrowing a list of entries down to 3. In the Stampede's inaugural game, they beat an opposing team of American Indoor Football Association (AIFA) All-Stars, 46–26, in the 2009 AIFA Kickoff Classic. In their first regular season game, the Stampede were defeated by the reigning AIFA champion, Florence Phantoms by a score of 19 - 13. In their second ever regular season game, the Stampede defeated the Baltimore Mariners 37-34. After a 2-4 start, Morris fired head coach Kelly Logan and replaced him with defensive coordinator, Mike McDonald. Marques Colston, a New Orleans Saints wide receiver, held a share during the team's first season. Colston left the group after the inaugural season, citing philosophical differences.

2009 season schedule

2010
For the 2010 season, the team hired Ramon Robinson as their head coach. Robinson helped the Stampede turn their record around, leading them to an 11-3 regular season record, clinching a playoff spot. The #2 seeded Stampede defeated the #3 Erie Storm by a score of 52-48 in the first Stampede playoff game ever. The following week, the Stampede were defeated by the undefeated Mariners by a score of 65-13 in the Eastern Conference Championship Game.

2011
The Stampede began the 2011 season by naming Bernie Nowotarski the team's head coach and general manager. 2011 also brought a new league for the Stampede, as they moved into the Southern Indoor Football League (SIFL) after the merger of the AIFA's Eastern Conference with the SIFL After an 0–6 start to the 2011 season, Nowotarski was removed as General Manager and Head Coach of the Stampede. He was replaced by Josh Resignalo. The following season, the SIFL disbanded, leading the Stampede to re-join their former league, which is now going by American Indoor Football (AIF).

2012
In 2012, the team joined American Indoor Football (AIF), the league was run by previous AIFA owner/CEO John Morris. In January 2012, Morris sold the team to local businessman Justin Coble, who made moves to broaden the fan base and re-energize the city of Harrisburg about the Stampede team; Colston returned to the team's ownership group just prior to the start of the 2012 season.

2013
As of August 2012 Marques Colston's Dynasty Group acquired full control of the team and had continued to grow the footprint of the Stampede with its primary mission of servicing the community in the Greater Harrisburg area. The Stampede advanced to the AIF Championship Game for the second straight year in 2013, this time defeating the Cape Fear Heroes 57-42 earning their first ever title.

2014
In September 2013, the Stampede announced that they would be joining the Professional Indoor Football League for the 2014 season.

After the 2014 season, on December 30, 2014, Colston shuttered the team due to financial problems and purchased a stake in the Philadelphia Soul of the Arena Football League.

Final roster

All-league players
The following Stampede players were named to All-League Teams:
 QB E. J. Nemeth (3)
 RB Victory Sesay
 WR Scorpio Brown (2), Colis Martin (2), Jerrell Jones
 OL Randall Bennett (2), Adam Hoffman, Troy Bennett
 DL Daniel Orlebar (2), Fearon Wright (2), Jashawn Williams, Amara Kamara
 LB Vincent Tiberi (2), Jermaine Thaxton (3), Will Hines (4)
 DB Richard Johnson, Armar Watson (2), Travis Proctor
 K Cap Poklemba
 KR Armar Watson (2)

Season-by-season results

References

External links
 Official website
 Stampede's 2009 stats
 Stampede's 2010 stats
 Stampede's 2011 stats

 
2007 establishments in Pennsylvania
2014 disestablishments in Pennsylvania